NG 6 is the fossilized upper cranium of the species Homo erectus. It was discovered in Ngandong, Indonesia by C. ter Haar and GHR von Koenigswald in 1931–1933.

Its characteristics include a slightly larger braincase than other erectus samples and a fairly recent age of 50,000 - 27,000 years.

See also
 List of fossil sites (with link directory)
 List of hominina (hominid) fossils (with images)

References 

Homo erectus fossils